Douaumont is a former commune in the Meuse department in Grand Est in north-eastern France. On 1 January 2019, it was merged into the new commune Douaumont-Vaux.

History

The village was a single street lying on an east-west axis and appears to have been connected to a local industry. The population was probably around 100 to 200.

The village was totally destroyed during World War I. Today the Douaumont Ossuary, which contains the remains of more than 100,000 unknown soldiers of both French and German nationalities found on the battlefield, stands high above the landscape.

Douaumont Fort

The fort was built south-east of the village.

The construction work for Fort de Douaumont started in 1885 and the fort was continually reinforced until 1913. The fort is situated on some of the highest ground in the area.
At the very beginning of the Battle of Verdun (February 1916) and due to French unpreparedness, the fort was easily captured  by a small German raiding party. Douaumont was later recaptured by the French Army in October 1916, after major casualties on both sides.

See also
 Douaumont Ossuary
 Zone rouge (First World War)
 List of French villages destroyed in World War I
 Communes of the Meuse department
 La Grande Illusion (film, Jean Renoir, 1937)

References

"Douaumont.Vérité et Légende", Alain Denizot,1998,Librairie Académique Perrin,.
 "Fort Douaumont" (Revised edition), Christina Holstein, 2010, Pen and Sword Books Ltd,  .

External links

Les fort Séré de Rivières le fort de Douaumont 
 Douaumont ossuary
 GPS-Teamprojekt "Verdun - Somme - 1916"
 Photos of exterior and interior of Fort Douaumont

Former communes of Meuse (department)
Buildings and structures in Meuse (department)
Duchy of Bar